This is a list of 270 species in Scaptomyza, a genus of vinegar flies in the family Drosophilidae.

Scaptomyza species

 Scaptomyza aberrans Hardy, 1965 i c g
 Scaptomyza abrupta Hackman i c g
 Scaptomyza acronastes Hardy, 1965 i c g
 Scaptomyza acuta Nishiharu, 1979 c g
 Scaptomyza adunca Hardy, 1965 i c g
 Scaptomyza adusta (Loew, 1862) i c g b
 Scaptomyza affinicuspidata Hardy, 1965 i c g
 Scaptomyza albovittata (Malloch) i c g
 Scaptomyza aloha Hackman i c g
 Scaptomyza amplialata Takada, Beppu & Toda, 1979 c g
 Scaptomyza ampliloba (Hardy, 1967) c g
 Scaptomyza andina Wheeler & Takada, 1966 c g
 Scaptomyza anechocerca Hardy, 1965 i c g
 Scaptomyza angustipennis (Frey, 1954) c g
 Scaptomyza anomala Hardy, 1965 i c g
 Scaptomyza apicata (Thomson, 1969) i c g
 Scaptomyza apiciguttula Hardy, 1965 i
 Scaptomyza apicigutulla Hardy, 1965 c g
 Scaptomyza apicipuncta Malloch, 1934 c g
 Scaptomyza apponopusilla Hardy, 1965 c g
 Scaptomyza apponpusilla Hardy, 1965 i g
 Scaptomyza argentifrons Hardy, 1965 i c g
 Scaptomyza articulata Hardy, 1965 i c g
 Scaptomyza atahualpa Hackman, 1959 c g
 Scaptomyza atlantica Hackman, 1955 c g
 Scaptomyza australis Malloch, 1923 c g
 Scaptomyza baechlii Sidorenko, 1993 c g
 Scaptomyza basiloba Hardy, 1965 i c g
 Scaptomyza bicolor Malloch, 1934 c g
 Scaptomyza bilobata Hardy, 1965 i c g
 Scaptomyza bipars Hardy, 1965 i c g
 Scaptomyza bipunctipennis Wheeler, 1952 i c g
 Scaptomyza biseta Malloch, 1932 c g
 Scaptomyza bogotae Wheeler & Takada, 1966 c g
 Scaptomyza boninensis Okada, 1973 c g
 Scaptomyza brachycerca Hardy, 1965 i c g
 Scaptomyza brevilamellata (Frey, 1954) c g
 Scaptomyza brunnimaculata Hardy, 1965 i c g
 Scaptomyza bryani (Wirth, 1952) c g
 Scaptomyza bryanti Hackman i c g
 Scaptomyza buccata Hackman i c g
 Scaptomyza budnikae Brncic, 1983 c g
 Scaptomyza caliginosa Hardy, 1967 c g
 Scaptomyza camptochaites Hardy, 1965 i c g
 Scaptomyza carinata Okada, 1973 c g
 Scaptomyza cerina Hardy, 1965 i c g
 Scaptomyza chauliodon (Hardy, 1965) c g
 Scaptomyza choi Kang, Lee & Bahng, 1965 c g
 Scaptomyza chylizosoma (Seguy, 1938) c g
 Scaptomyza clavata Okada, 1973 c g
 Scaptomyza clavifera Wheeler & Takada, 1966 c g
 Scaptomyza cnecosoma Hardy, 1965 i c g
 Scaptomyza cochleata Burla, 1957 c g
 Scaptomyza concinna Hardy, 1965 i c g
 Scaptomyza confusa Hardy, 1965 i c g
 Scaptomyza connata Hardy, 1965 i c g
 Scaptomyza consimilis Hackman, 1955 c g
 Scaptomyza contestata (Hardy, 1967) c g
 Scaptomyza coquilletti Wheeler & Takada, 1966 c g
 Scaptomyza cornuta Hardy, 1965 i c g
 Scaptomyza crassifemur (Grimshaw, 1901) c g
 Scaptomyza cryptoloba Hardy, 1965 i c g
 Scaptomyza ctenophora Hardy, 1965 i c g
 Scaptomyza cuspidata Hardy, 1965 i c g
 Scaptomyza cyrandraea Hardy, 1965 i g
 Scaptomyza cyrtandrae Hardy, 1965 c g
 Scaptomyza dankoi Wheeler & Takada, 1966 c g
 Scaptomyza decepta Hardy, 1965 i c g
 Scaptomyza deemingi Tsacas, 1972 c g
 Scaptomyza deludens Hardy, 1967 c g
 Scaptomyza dentata Hardy, 1965 i c g
 Scaptomyza denticauda Malloch, 1934 c g
 Scaptomyza devexa Hardy, 1965 i c g
 Scaptomyza diaphorocerca Hardy, 1965 i c g
 Scaptomyza domita Hardy, 1965 i c g
 Scaptomyza dorsalis Seguy, 1938 c g
 Scaptomyza dubautiae Hardy, 1965 i c g
 Scaptomyza dubia Hardy, 1965 i c g
 Scaptomyza elmoi Takada, 1970 c g
 Scaptomyza eurystylata Hardy, 1965 i c g
 Scaptomyza evexa Hardy, 1965 i c g
 Scaptomyza exigua (Grimshaw) i c g
 Scaptomyza exilis McEvey, 1990 c g
 Scaptomyza fastigata Hardy, 1965 i c g
 Scaptomyza finitima Hardy, 1965 i c g
 Scaptomyza flava Fallen, 1823 i c g b
 Scaptomyza flavella Harrison, 1959 c g
 Scaptomyza flavida Hardy, 1965 i c g
 Scaptomyza flavifacies (Malloch, 1932) c g
 Scaptomyza flaviventris Hackman, 1959 i c g
 Scaptomyza freyi Hackman, 1959 c g
 Scaptomyza frustulifera (Frey, 1954) c g
 Scaptomyza fuscifrons Hackman i c g
 Scaptomyza fuscinervis Malloch, 1924 c g
 Scaptomyza fuscitarsis Harrison, 1959 c g
 Scaptomyza gilvivirilia Hardy, 1965 i g
 Scaptomyza gilvivirlia Hardy, 1965 c g
 Scaptomyza glauca (Hardy, 1965) c g
 Scaptomyza gracilis (Walker, 1853) c g
 Scaptomyza grahami Hackman, 1959 c g
 Scaptomyza graminum (Fallen, 1823) i c g
 Scaptomyza griseola (Zetterstedt, 1847) c g
 Scaptomyza hackmani Hardy, 1965 i c g
 Scaptomyza hamata Hardy, 1965 i c g
 Scaptomyza hardyi Hackman i c g
 Scaptomyza heedi Wheeler & Takada, 1966 c g
 Scaptomyza helvola (Frey, 1954) c g
 Scaptomyza hennigi Hackman, 1959 c g
 Scaptomyza hexasticha Okada, 1973 c g
 Scaptomyza himalayana Takada, 1970 c g
 Scaptomyza hirsuta Wheeler, 1949 i c g
 Scaptomyza horaeoptera Tsacas & Cogan, 1976 c g
 Scaptomyza horrida (Frey, 1954) c g
 Scaptomyza hsui Hackman, 1955 i c g
 Scaptomyza ichneumon (Knab, 1914) c g
 Scaptomyza impunctata (Frey, 1945) c g
 Scaptomyza inaequalis (Grimshaw) i c g
 Scaptomyza incerta (Frey, 1954) c g
 Scaptomyza inermis Hardy, 1965 i c g
 Scaptomyza inflatus (Kaneshiro, 1969) c g
 Scaptomyza infurcula Hardy, 1965 i c g
 Scaptomyza innotabilis Hardy, 1965 i c g
 Scaptomyza intermedia (Duda, 1927) c
 Scaptomyza intricata Hardy, 1965 i c g
 Scaptomyza isopedon Hardy, 1965 i c g
 Scaptomyza kaavae (Malloch, 1934) c g
 Scaptomyza kauaiensis Hackman i c g
 Scaptomyza kilembea Tsacas, 1972 c g
 Scaptomyza latifrons Malloch, 1932 c g
 Scaptomyza latitergum Hardy, 1965 i c g
 Scaptomyza levata Hardy, 1965 i c g
 Scaptomyza lobifera Hardy, 1965 i c g
 Scaptomyza lonchoptera (Hardy, 1965) c g
 Scaptomyza longipecten Hackman i c g
 Scaptomyza longipennis Seguy, 1938 c g
 Scaptomyza longisetosa Hackman i c g
 Scaptomyza macroptera Wheeler & Takada, 1966 c g
 Scaptomyza maculifera Becker, 1919 i c g
 Scaptomyza malada Wheeler and Takada, 1966 i c g
 Scaptomyza mateolata McEvey, 1990 c g
 Scaptomyza mauiensis (Grimshaw) i c g
 Scaptomyza mecocera Hardy, 1965 i g
 Scaptomyza mecocerca Hardy, 1965 c g
 Scaptomyza mediana Hardy, 1965 i c g
 Scaptomyza mediopallens Hackman i c g
 Scaptomyza melancholica (Duda, 1927) c g
 Scaptomyza melanissima Okada, 1966 c g
 Scaptomyza meocerca Hardy, 1965 c g
 Scaptomyza merina McEvey, 1990 c g
 Scaptomyza mimitantalia Tsacas & Cogan, 1976 c g
 Scaptomyza mimula Hardy, 1965 i c g
 Scaptomyza mitchelli Hackman i c g
 Scaptomyza molokaiensis Hardy, 1967 c g
 Scaptomyza montana Wheeler, 1949 i g
 Scaptomyza monticola (Grimshaw) i c g
 Scaptomyza multidenta Hardy, 1965 i c g
 Scaptomyza multispinosa Malloch, 1934 c g
 Scaptomyza mumfordi Malloch, 1933 c g
 Scaptomyza mutica Hardy, 1965 i c g
 Scaptomyza nasalis (Grimshaw, 1901) c g
 Scaptomyza neoandina Wheeler & Takada, 1966 c g
 Scaptomyza neocyrtandrae Burgunder, Rampasso, & O’Grady, 2022
 Scaptomyza neoevexa O'Grady, Bonacum, Desalle & Val, 2003 c g
 Scaptomyza neokauaiensis O'Grady, Bonacum, Desalle & Val, 2003 c g
 Scaptomyza neosilvicola O'Grady, Bonacum, Desalle & Val, 2003 c g
 Scaptomyza nigricosta Wheeler & Takada, 1966 c g
 Scaptomyza nigripalpis Malloch, 1924 c g
 Scaptomyza nigrita Wheeler, 1952 i c g
 Scaptomyza nigrocella Wheeler, 1949 i c g
 Scaptomyza nigrosignata Hardy, 1965 i c g
 Scaptomyza noei Brncic, 1955 c g
 Scaptomyza oahuensis Hardy, 1967 c g
 Scaptomyza obscuricornis (Grimshaw) i c g
 Scaptomyza obscurifrons (Grimshaw) i c g
 Scaptomyza ochromata Hardy, 1965 i c g
 Scaptomyza okadai Hackman, 1959 c g
 Scaptomyza ostensa Hardy, 1965 i c g
 Scaptomyza oxyphallus Tsacas, 1990 c g
 Scaptomyza palata (Hardy, 1965) c g
 Scaptomyza pallida (Zetterstedt, 1847) i c g b
 Scaptomyza pallifrons Hackman i c g
 Scaptomyza palmae Hardy, 1965 i c g
 Scaptomyza paradusta Wheeler, 1952 i c g
 Scaptomyza paralobae Hardy, 1965 i c g
 Scaptomyza parandina Wheeler & Takada, 1966 c g
 Scaptomyza parasplendens Okada, 1966 c g
 Scaptomyza paravittata Wheeler, 1952 i c g
 Scaptomyza parva (Grimshaw, 1901) c g
 Scaptomyza pectinifera (Frey, 1954) c g
 Scaptomyza penicula Hardy, 1965 i c g
 Scaptomyza perkinsi (Grimshaw, 1901) c g
 Scaptomyza personata Wheeler & Takada, 1966 c g
 Scaptomyza philipensis Bock, 1986 c g
 Scaptomyza photophilia Hardy, 1965 i c g
 Scaptomyza phryxothrix Hardy, 1965 i c g
 Scaptomyza picifemorata Hackman, 1959 c g
 Scaptomyza platyrhina Hardy, 1967 c g
 Scaptomyza pleurolineata Wheeler & Takada, 1966 c g
 Scaptomyza polygonia Okada, 1956 c g
 Scaptomyza protensa Hardy, 1965 i c g
 Scaptomyza prunctivena Hardy, 1965 i g
 Scaptomyza pseudovittata Brncic, 1955 c g
 Scaptomyza punctivena Hardy, 1965 c g
 Scaptomyza pusilla (Grimshaw) i c g
 Scaptomyza pygaea Tsacas, 1990 c g
 Scaptomyza quadridentata Hardy, 1965 i c g
 Scaptomyza quadriseriata Malloch, 1934 c g
 Scaptomyza quadruangulata Singh & Dash, 1993 c g
 Scaptomyza recava Hardy, 1965 i c g
 Scaptomyza recta Hardy, 1965 i c g
 Scaptomyza reducta (Hardy, 1965) c g
 Scaptomyza remota (Walker, 1849) c g
 Scaptomyza retusa Hardy, 1965 i c g
 Scaptomyza robusta Hardy, 1965 i c g
 Scaptomyza rostrata Hardy, 1965 i c g
 Scaptomyza rotundiloba Hardy, 1965 i c g
 Scaptomyza ruficornis (Meigen, 1838) c g
 Scaptomyza salvadorae Wheeler & Takada, 1966 c g
 Scaptomyza samurai Wheeler & Takada, 1966 c g
 Scaptomyza santacruzi Val, 1983 c g
 Scaptomyza santahelenica Tsacas & Cogan, 1976 c g
 Scaptomyza scoliops Hardy, 1965 i c g
 Scaptomyza scoloplichas Hardy, 1965 i c g
 Scaptomyza semiflava Hardy, 1965 i c g
 Scaptomyza setiger Hardy, 1965 i c g
 Scaptomyza setosa Wheeler & Takada, 1966 c g
 Scaptomyza setosiloba Hardy, 1965 i c g
 Scaptomyza setosiscutellum (Hardy, 1965) c g
 Scaptomyza sichuanica Sidorenko, 1995 c g
 Scaptomyza silvata Okada, 1966 c g
 Scaptomyza silvicola Hardy, 1965 i c g
 Scaptomyza sinica Lin & Ting, 1971 c g
 Scaptomyza spiculipennis Takada & Momma, 1975 c g
 Scaptomyza spilota Hardy, 1965 i c g
 Scaptomyza spinipalpis Seguy, 1934 c g
 Scaptomyza stamineifrons Hackman i g
 Scaptomyza stramineifrons Hackman, 1962 c g
 Scaptomyza stratifrons Hackman i g
 Scaptomyza striaticeps Wheeler & Takada, 1966 c g
 Scaptomyza striatifrons Hackman, 1959 c g
 Scaptomyza subandina Wheeler & Takada, 1966 c g
 Scaptomyza subsplendens (Duda, 1935) c g
 Scaptomyza substrigata Meijere, 1914 c g
 Scaptomyza subvittata Hackman, 1959 c g
 Scaptomyza swezeyi (Wirth, 1952) c g
 Scaptomyza taigensis Sidorenko & Toda, 1996 c g
 Scaptomyza taiwanica Lin & Ting, 1971 c g
 Scaptomyza teinoptera Hackman, 1955 i c g
 Scaptomyza tenuata Hardy, 1965 i c g
 Scaptomyza terminalis (Loew, 1863) i c g
 Scaptomyza throckmortoni Hardy, 1967 c g
 Scaptomyza tistai Kumar & Gupta, 1991 c g
 Scaptomyza trivittata Hardy, 1965 i c g
 Scaptomyza trochanterata Collin, 1953 i c g
 Scaptomyza tumidula Hardy, 1965 i c g
 Scaptomyza uliginosa Hardy, 1965 i c g
 Scaptomyza umbrosa Hardy, 1965 i c g
 Scaptomyza undulata (Grimshaw, 1901) c g
 Scaptomyza unipunctum (Zetterstedt, 1847) i c g
 Scaptomyza univitta Hardy, 1965 i c g
 Scaptomyza vagabunda Hardy, 1965 i c g
 Scaptomyza varia Hardy, 1965 i c g
 Scaptomyza varifrons (Grimshaw) i c g
 Scaptomyza varipicta Hardy, 1965 i c g
 Scaptomyza villosa Hardy, 1965 i c g
 Scaptomyza vittata (Coquillett, 1895) i c g
 Scaptomyza vittiger (Hardy, 1965) c g
 Scaptomyza waialealeae Hardy, 1965 i c g
 Scaptomyza wheeleri Hackman, 1959 i c g b
 Scaptomyza xanthopleura Hardy, 1965 i c g
 Scaptomyza yakutica Sidorenko & Toda, 1996 c g

Data sources: i = ITIS, c = Catalogue of Life, g = GBIF, b = Bugguide.net

References

Scaptomyza
Articles created by Qbugbot